Tripuramba (1910–1979) was an Indian actress and singer who worked in Kannada films. She is best remembered for her role Sulochana in the first Kannada talkie Sati Sulochana, released in 1934, which made her the first heroine of Kannada cinema.

Career 
Tripuramba involved in theatre and became an accomplished actress and singer. She played the role of Sulochana, the wife of Indrajith, in the first talkie film of Kannada cinema Sati Sulochana opposite Subbaiah Naidu. This historic movie made her the first heroine of Kannada.

Surprisingly Tripuramba did not do much movies. Her next and last movie was Purandaradasa in 1937.
She died in 1979.

Filmography 
Apart from numerous stage plays, Tripuramba acted in two films.

References

External links 

1910 births
20th-century Indian actresses
Actresses in Kannada cinema
People from Karnataka
1979 deaths